Indrapuri is a district in Aceh Besar Regency, Aceh Special Region, Indonesia.
It covers an area of 197.04 km2 and had a population of 19,975 at the 2010 Census and 22,372 at the 2020 Census. The district encompasses 52 villages (gampong) and has the post code of 23363.

References

Aceh Besar Regency